Thesprotos Football Club is a Greek professional football club based in Igoumenitsa, Thesprotia, Greece. The club was founded in 1948. They compete in the Super League 2, the second tier of Greek football.

History

1979–1988
Thesprotos participated in the Corfu FCA Championships. The team won twice, securing their rise to the national categories. They were immediately downgraded to local. With the creation of a new league, FCA Thesprotia, which Thesropotos joined in 1984, they began to pick up wins. The team won the 1984–1985 championship and was promoted to the Delta Ethniki. Once again they failed to remain in the category. In 1986–1987, they won the local championship again and competed in the 1987 amateur championship without winning promotion. In 1987–1988, Thesprotos again won the local championship and again competed in the Special Amateur Championship 1988. This time they won promotion to the Delta Ethniki.

1988–2003
From 1988–1989 until 1994–1995, Thesprotos participated in the 4th National. They excelled for some years, but failed to advance to the Delta Ethniki. In 1994–1995 the team was downgraded to local. The following year they again won the local championship and returned to the 4th National. After three years they managed to gain promotion to the Gamma Ethniki. The relegation was immediate to the 4th National while the following year the team was relegated to the locals following a second consecutive relegation. In 2001–2002, the team won the local championship and went to the 4th National. The team was unable to stand and was relegated to the local championship.

2003–2012
In the following years, Thesprotos competed in the local championship without winning. In 2007–2008 the team won the championship and again climbed to the 4th National. For the next four years they competed at the 4th National. They competed in the category, but failed to advance to the 3rd National. The 2011–2012 season was once again downgraded to local.

2012–2018
In the 2012–2013 season, Thesprotos won the championship and participated in the 2013 Special Amateur Championship. They again went to the 3rd National Championship where they stayed for the following years. The 2014–2015 season placed fifth while the 2015–2016 season ranked 6th. The 2016–2017 season finished 9th while the 2017–2018 season again ranked 5th.

2018–2019 
Thesprotos took the second place in the championship and qualified for the anodic barrels. They defeated Niki Volos on May 5, 2019 at Panthessal Stadium 0-1 and on May 12 at Igoumenitsa 2-0 and take the historic rise in the professional categories.

2019–
In the 2019–2020 season, Thesprotos participated in the Football League Greece (Third tier). The team placed tenth, above the relegation zone when the season ended because of the COVID-19 pandemic, just three fixtures before the end.

In the 2020–2021 season, the team was still in the Football League, this time in the Northern group. They finished sixth and acquired the promotion to Superleague 2 (second tier) for the first time in their history.

Thesprotos with a team mostly consisted with youths, finished 12 out of 17 in the 2022-2022 Northern Group and managed to renew his stay at Superleague 2 for another season, again under coaching from Argentinian Juan Ramón Rocha.

Players

Current squad

Honours

Domestic 
Leagues:
Delta Ethniki (Fourth Division)
 Winners (1): 1998–99
Corfu–Thesprotia FCA Championship (Local Championship)
 Winners (2): 1978–79, 1981–82
Thesprotia FCA Championship (Local Championship)
 Winners (7): 1984–85, 1986–87, 1987–88, 1995–96, 2001–02, 2007–08, 2012–13

Cups:
Thesprotia FCA Cup (Local Cup)
 Winners (15): 1985–86, 1987–88, 1989–90, 1990–91, 1993–94, 1994–95, 1995–96, 1996–97, 1997–98, 1998–99, 2007–08, 2008–09, 2010–11, 2012–13, 2017–18
Thesprotia FCA Super Cup (Local Super Cup)
 Winners (1): 2017–18

Notable players 
 Felipe Gomes
 Ján Lazorík
 Giorgos Kapouranis
 Manolis Skoufalis

Former players 
 James Okoli
 Ermal Tahiri

External links 
 

 
Association football clubs established in 1948
1948 establishments in Greece
Football clubs in Epirus
Super League Greece 2 clubs